Michigan Beach is a beach and small community on the south shore of Lake Ontario in St. Catharines, Regional Municipality of Niagara, Ontario, Canada and is part of the Golden Horseshoe region. It is located between Port Dalhousie and Port Weller. Named for the Michigan Central Railroad, which operated a rail line to the east side of the harbour at Port Dalhousie, Michigan Beach is today home to the Port Dalhousie Pier Marina, Westcliffe Park, Pine Grove Public School and a residential neighbourhood developed in the 1960's and 1970's. The Waterfront Trail runs through the neighbourhood.

References

 
 

Neighbourhoods in St. Catharines